I Am Pierre Riviere is a 1976 French drama film directed by Christine Lipinska.

Plot
The film is based on documents compiled by French philosopher, Michel Foucault. In a Normandy village in 1835, a young man, Pierre Rivière, murdered his mother, sister and brother before fleeing to the countryside.

Using a cast of local villagers, the film uses detailed and historically accurate re-enactments to create an intense, disturbing atmosphere. The crime and resultant trial is recounted from varied perspectives, including Pierre's confession. The result is a rich, complex narrative that interrogates truth and history.

Cast
 Jacques Spiesser - Pierre Rivière
 André Rouyer - Le président du tribunal
 Max Vialle - François Lecomte
 Francis Huster - L'avocat de la défense
 Michel Robin - Le père
 Thérèse Quentin - La mère
 Mado Maurin - La grand-mère
 Marianne Epin - Victoire (as Marianne Épin)
 Isabelle Huppert - Aimée
 Vincent Ropion - Pierre enfant
 Claude Bouchery - Le premier médecin
 Michel Delahaye - Le second médecin
 Roger Jacquet - Le bûcheron
 François Dyrek - L'homme de la battue
 Patrick Floersheim - Le curé

See also
 Isabelle Huppert on screen and stage

References

Notes

External links

1976 films
1970s French-language films
Films directed by Christine Lipinska
1970s historical drama films
French historical drama films
Films set in the 1830s
1976 drama films
1970s French films